Vaughan Woods State Park is a public recreation area located along the Salmon Falls River on the western edge of South Berwick, Maine, at the New Hampshire border. The lands were bequeathed to the state by Elizabeth Vaughan in 1949.

References

External links

Vaughan Woods State Park Department of Agriculture, Conservation and Forestry
Vaughan Woods State Park Map Department of Agriculture, Conservation and Forestry

State parks of Maine
Protected areas of York County, Maine
Protected areas established in 1949
1949 establishments in Maine
South Berwick, Maine